The Lithuanian Liberation Army (sometimes also named as Lithuanian Freedom Army) ( or LLA) was a Lithuanian underground organization established by Kazys Veverskis (codename Senis), a student at Vilnius University, on December 13, 1941. Its goal were to re-establish independent Lithuania via political and military means. During the Nazi Germany occupation it opposed German policies, but did not begin armed resistance. The armed struggle began in mid-1944 when Red Army reached the Lithuanian borders after the Minsk Offensive. The LLA became the first wave of the Lithuanian partisans, armed anti-Soviet guerrilla fighters. It attempted to become the central command of the armed struggle. However, the organization was liquidated by the Soviet security forces (NKVD and KGB) by April 1946. The remnants of the organization were absorbed by other partisans. The guerrilla war continued until 1953.

Organization and German occupation
The LLA distanced itself from other political resistance organizations in Lithuania. It believed that various organizations and factions splintered Lithuanian unity by petty bickering. The LLA was supposed to be a disciplined, military-based organization. It was one of the few organizations that did not rely on either Soviet Union or Nazi Germany for support and emphasized the determination of the Lithuanian people. It was the only sizable organization that did not participate in the activities of the Supreme Committee for the Liberation of Lithuania and did not support the creation of the Nazi-sponsored Lithuanian Territorial Defense Force. The organization also strictly prohibited its members from leaving Lithuania (i.e. retreating with the German Army).

Veverskis was in charge of the headquarters, personally oversaw writing of orders and directives, and published newspaper Karinės ir politinės žinios (Military and Political News), targeting members of LLA and its commanders, and Karžygys (Warrior), targeting general public. His right-hand man was lieutenant Adolfas Eidimtas (codename Žybartas, Vygantas). Veverskis also actively recruited new members, particularly targeting Lithuanians serving in the Schutzmannschaft (Police Battalions). Among the recruits were twelve former colonels of the Lithuanian Army, who became commanders of LLA districts. The Army was organized in four regions (Vilnius, Kaunas, Šiauliai, and Panevėžys), which were further subdivided into districts based on the administrative divisions of Lithuania. According to regulations, each district had to have headquarters with operational, reconnaissance, organizational, and personnel departments. It unsuccessfully planned to send troops to combat Polish Armia Krajowa in the Vilnius Region (see the Polish–Lithuanian relations during World War II).

Soviet occupation and liquidation
On July 1, 1944, LLA declared the state of war and ordered all its able members to mobilize into platoons, stationed in forests. The organization, possibly drawing from the experiences of the 1941 anti-Soviet uprising, envisioned a brief uprising followed by establishment of the independent Lithuanian state. The departments were replaced by two sectors – operational, called Vanagai (Hawks or Falcons; abbreviated VS), and organizational (abbreviated OS). Vanagai, commanded by Albinas Karalius (codename Varenis), were the armed fighters while the organizational sector was tasked with passive resistance, including supply of food, information, and transport to Vanagai. Staff headquarters were in Plokštinė forest near Plateliai Lake, Samogitia where LLA had a training camp. In August 1944, to bolster LLA prestige among political groups, Ververskis together with general Motiejus Pečiulionis and engineer Bronius Snarskis established the short-lived Committee for the Defense of Lithuania which was supposed to unite all anti-Soviet resistance groups and factions. 

Many LLA members retreated to Germany, becoming the displaced persons, others responded to the call starting the Lithuanian partisan movement. According to the testimony of Eidimtas to NKVD, by mid-1944 LLA numbered up to 10,000 men, but that is likely an exaggeration. The LLA obtained limited amount of armament and munitions from Nazi Germany. In August–September 1944, LLA sent about 100 fighters to a German reconnaissance school; they returned as paratroopers. The organization was not successful in fighting the Soviets. According to official statistics from NKVD, the Soviets killed 659 and arrested 753 members of the LLA by January 26, 1945. Founder Veverskis was killed in December 1944, Eidimtas was arrested in April 1945, the headquarters were liquidated in December 1945. This represented the failure of highly centralized resistance, as the organization was too dependent on Veverskis and other top commanders. Lower-level organization remained, especially in Samogitia and Aukštaitija, and was absorbed by the partisan movement. Remnants of its organizational structure survived until the end of the guerrilla war in 1953. One of the LLA members, Jonas Žemaitis, became the commander of the Union of Lithuanian Freedom Fighters.

References

Military units and formations established in 1941
Military units and formations disestablished in 1946
Paramilitary organizations based in Lithuania